Yuyuevirus is a genus of negative-strand RNA viruses which infect invertebrates. Member viruses have bisegmented genomes. It is the only genus in the family Yueviridae, which in turn is the only family in the order Goujianvirales and class Yunchangviricetes. Two species are recognized: Beihai yuyuevirus and Shahe yuyuevirus.

Etymology 
Goujianvirales is named in honor of Goujian the king of Yuè State. Yunchangviricetes is named in honor of Yǔncháng, the father of Gōujiàn.

Genome 

Yuyueviruses have negative-sense, single-stranded RNA genomes that are bisegemented. The total genome length is 7.8–8.2 kbp.

Taxonomy 

The genus contains two species:

Beihai yuyuevirus
Shahe yuyuevirus

References

Negarnaviricota
Virus genera